Livewire is an audio-over-IP system created by Axia Audio, a division of Telos Alliance. Its primary purpose is routing and distributing broadcast-quality audio in radio stations.

The original Livewire standard was introduced in 2003 and has since been superseded by a second version, Livewire+. Livewire+ includes compatibility with the AES67 and Ravenna standards to allow interoperability with equipment from other manufacturers. Designed as a superset of Livewire functionality utilizing common protocols and formats, Livewire+ is available as an open standard through Axia's Livewire+ Partner Program.

Livewire+ provides flexible routing and transport of audio streams using multicast networking, with the ability to connect any input to any output (known as "anywhere-to-anywhere routing"). Distribution utilises standard IP and Ethernet over twisted pair cabling.

Protocol

The following table lists ports and protocols used in Livewire systems.

References

Audio engineering
Audio network protocols